Hope for Portugal Movement (MEP) was a minor centrist political party in Portugal. It had no representatives in the Assembly of the Republic, the Portuguese legislature. Its name in Portuguese could also mean incentive expression: Movement "Have Hope Portugal".

It was formed on 23 July 2008 when the Portuguese Constitutional Court accepted the necessary 8,400 signatures for it to be legally recognized. Portuguese activist and entrepreneur Rui Marques was the first face of the then civic group, that would originate the MEP. The first party congress is scheduled for 4/5 October 2008, and it is due to approve the party's program and statutes. MEP has announced it is going to contest the European Parliament and legislative elections of 2009.

Due to the low results achieved by the party in the 2011 elections, Rui Marques resigned as party chairman. On 29 January 2012 the party released a statement informing party members, motivated by the weak results achieved in the 4 elections in which they contested, that the party would be dissolved as a political party although continuing its action as a civic movement.

On 9 January 2013 the dissolution of the party was accepted by the Constitutional Court, with effect since 12 December 2012.

References

External links
Official website
Official blog
Provisional program (in Portuguese)

Defunct political parties in Portugal
Centrist parties in Portugal
Political parties established in 2008
2008 establishments in Portugal
2012 disestablishments in Portugal
Political parties disestablished in 2012